Landgasthof Löwen is a traditional inn with a large hall and a sandstone wine cellar located in Heimiswil, Switzerland. 

The first written record about it is from 1340 and among visitors are many celebrities including the first Swiss astronaut Claude Nicollier.

See also 
List of oldest companies

References

External links 
Homepage
Facebook page
Location on Google Maps

Hotels in Switzerland
Restaurants in Switzerland
Companies established in the 14th century
14th-century establishments in Switzerland